Anthorn (pronounced  ) is a village in Cumbria, England. It is the location of the Anthorn radio station, broadcasting specialised low frequency signals for timekeeping and navigation.

History
Originally no more than a cluster of cottages and small farms on the shore, the village increased in size and importance in 1942, when an existing First World War landing strip was developed as HMS Nuthatch, a Royal Naval Air Station. The RAF station closed in 1958, and Anthorn Radio Station is now the site of a large mast field for the NATO VLF transmitter, the NPL time signal and an eLoran timing signal. In 187072 the township had a population of 197.

Governance
Anthorn is part of the parliamentary constituency of Workington. In the 2019 general election, Mark Jenkinson, the Conservative candidate for Workington, was elected MP, overturning a 9.4 per cent Labour majority from the 2017 election to eject Shadow Environment Secretary Sue Hayman by a margin of 4136 votes.  Prior to the 2019 general election, Labour had held the seat since World War II, with the exception of the 1976 by-election in which the Conservative candidate was elected.

See also

Listed buildings in Bowness

References

External links

 Cumbria County History Trust: Bowness on Solway (nb: provisional research only – see Talk page)
 Anthorn History and photographs.

Villages in Cumbria
Populated coastal places in Cumbria
Allerdale